Jayarajan Rajasekharan Nair, professionally credited as Jayaraj, is an Indian filmmaker, who predominantly works in Malayalam film industry.

He has won many awards, including Crystal Bear at the Berlin International Film Festival, the Golden Peacock award at the IFFI, and the FIPRESCI Award from the International Federation of Film Critics. He is also a seven-time recipient of the National Film Award and several Kerala State Film Awards. His films include Paithrukam (1993), Desadanam (1996),  4 The People (2004),  Vellapokkathil (2007), Ottaal (2015), and Bhayanakam (2018).

He is the founder of the Birds Club International and is actively involved in philanthropic work.

Early life
During his stay at Thiruvananthapuram, he attended film festivals including the International Film Festival of Kerala and watched many world classics. Kurosawa's Rashomon and DeSica's Bicycle Thieves were among them, and they influenced him immensely.

Career

Bharathan was impressed by Jayaraj and made him his assistant director for Chilambu(1986). Jayaraj then went on to be the assistant to Bharathan in six more films including the critically acclaimed Oru Minnaminunginte Nurunguvettam (1987) and Vaishali (1988). Jayaraj debuted as director with Vidyarambham (1990). His early career mainly produced commercially oriented films like Aakasha Kottayile Sultan (1991), Johnnie Walker (1992), High Way (1995), Thumboli Kadappuram (1995) and Arabia (1995).

Notable in his early career were Kudumbasametham (1992), Paithrukam (1993) and Sopanam (1993).  Desadanam (1997) was followed by Kaliyattam (1997) which was an adaptation of Shakespeare's Othello. It won him the National Film Award for Best Direction.

In 1999 Jayaraj started his nine-film series project Navarasa with Karunam, followed by Shantham (2001). Shantham won the National Film Award for Best Feature Film. The third in the Navarasa series was Bheebhatsa, a Hindi film followed by Adbutham and Veeram. In 2018, the sixth film in the series Bhayanakam was released and had won awards for Best Direction, Best Adapted Screenplay and Best Cinematography at the 2017 National Film Awards. On 10 June 2019, Tovino Thomas officially announced and shared the poster of Roudram 2018, the seventh film in the series. While sharing the poster on Facebook Tovino wrote, "The movie is based on real-life incidents that occurred in central Travancore, during the devastating floods that Kerala survived. Roudram 2018 portrays the tempestuous ferocity of nature, and the utter helplessness of humankind before that might."

Of late he has been doing commercial and art films and is successful in both genres. While Thilakkam (2003) and 4 The People (2004) were huge commercial successes Kannaki (2002), Makalkku (2005), Daivanamathil (2005) and Ottaal (2015) were critically acclaimed. Ottaal made history, becoming the first ever Malayalam movie to have swept all the top awards in the 20-year history of the International Film Festival of Kerala. The film was one of four Malayalam films selected to be a part of the Indian Panorama at the International Film Festival of India in Goa in November 2015.

Philanthropy
In an earnest effort towards conserving nature and strengthening people's welfare, Jayaraj founded the Jayaraj Foundation in 2010 and officially launched it on 6 June 2014. World Organisation of Hope's (WOH) ambitious programme 'SMART'[Sports, Music, Art and Recreation Therapy (Yoga and Meditation)]and "Birds Club international" are the two projects initiated by the foundation.

Word Organisation of Hope (WOH) is an organisation aimed at building children's awareness of their rights and to protect them. The programme SMART [Sports, Music, Art and Recreation Therapy (Yoga and Meditation)] is an offshoot of WOH. It supports children and adolescents in their own struggle to secure and defend their dreams.

Birds Club International (BCI) aims at creating miniature rain forests in schools and colleges, to make a better environment both for birds and humans. It plans to bring together the future generation and integrating more of society towards nature conservation activities. Several units of BCI have been started in many schools and colleges in Kerala, with the help of the Government of Kerala, to achieve this.

Awards

International awards

National Film Awards

1996 : Best Feature Film in Malayalam - Desadanam
1997 : Best Director - Kaliyattam
2001 : Best Film - Shantham
2005 : Best Film on National Integration - Daivanamathil
2007 : Best Non-Feature Film Direction - Vellapokkathil (The Deluge)
2014 : Best Film on Environment Conservation/Preservation - Ottaal
2017 : Best Director - Bhayanakam
2017 : Best Adapted Screenplay - Bhayanakam
2017 : Special Jury  mention - Rebirth

Kerala State Film Awards
1992 : Kerala State Film Award for Second Best Film - Kudumbasametham
1996 : Kerala State Film Award for Best Director - Deshadanam
1997 : Best Film with Popular Appeal and Aesthetic Value - Kaliyattam
1999 : Kerala State Film Award for Best Film - Karunam
2015 : Kerala State Film Award for Best Film - Ottaal

Filmfare Awards South
 1997 : Best Director : Kaliyattam
 2000 : Best Director : Karunam
 2000 : Best Film - Malayalam  : Karunam

V. Shantharam Awards
1997 : Kaliyattam
2001 : Shantham

John Abraham Awards
2000 : Karunam
2012 : Vellapokkathil

Asianet Film Awards
 2002: Asianet Film Award for Best Director for Kannaki

Ramu Karyatt Awards
1996 : Desadanam

P. Padmarajan Awards
1996 : Desadanam
2000 : Karunam

Filmography

References

External links
 
 All in the name of God The Hindu - 5 July 2005

Malayali people
20th-century Indian film directors
Malayalam film directors
Kerala State Film Award winners
Tamil film directors
1960 births
Living people
Filmfare Awards South winners
Best Director National Film Award winners
21st-century Indian film directors
Artists from Kottayam
Film directors from Kerala
Telugu film directors
Hindi-language film directors
Film producers from Kerala
Screenwriters from Kerala
Malayalam screenwriters
Best Adapted Screenplay National Film Award winners
Directors who won the Best Feature Film National Film Award
Directors who won the Best Film on Environment Conservation/Preservation National Film Award
Directors who won the Best Film on National Integration National Film Award